Gene Noble (Born James Eugene Roston III) is an American singer and songwriter, based in New York and Los Angeles. He is best known for the 2016 song "Only Love" which received airplay on radio stations around the world. He has written songs for artists such as Jason Derulo, Chris Brown, Faith Evans, Usher, CeeLo Green, Jay Z, Alicia Keys, John Legend and Diddy.

Early life and career
Roston grew up traveling with his father, who served in the US military and traveled to wherever in the world he was stationed. His father died in an attempt to rescue another man in 1986 when Roston was aged four. He later moved to Long Island, New York with his mother and brother. A year later, he began playing the piano and writing poetry. Inspired by singer Prince and R&B musician D’Angelo, Noble decided to pursue a career as a musical artist.

On March 4, 2014, Roston released his debut EP, Rebirth of Gene, which was described by Noisey as "Everything from his lofty vocals to the electro production." He released a cover of the 2013 song "Say Something" by A Great Big World.

In 2015, he released the song "Trust". He previously released another song, titled "Money Over Bullshit".

On October 6, 2017, he released the single "Never Know".

In 2017, he released the song "Stolen Moments", which features LaChardon. It would be included on his debut studio album The Cost. The song, as described by Roston, is about "the story of two people who can't officially be together because they are in other situations but it doesn't prevent them from finding time for each other."

In 2019 he appeared with Sting and Shaggy on NPR's Tiny Desk Concert series. His vocal contributions were featured prominently on the last track: a mashup of Shape of My Heart and Lucid Dreams.

Discography

Extended plays

Singles

As lead artist

As featured artist

Guest appearances

References

External links
"A Touch Of Nobility: Soulster Gene Noble" — Etvas Magazine
"The Travel Seven: Gene Noble" — Parlour Magazine

Singers from Kansas
21st-century African-American male singers
American contemporary R&B singers
21st-century American singers
Songwriters from New York (state)
21st-century American male singers
African-American songwriters
American male songwriters
1982 births
Living people